Claudio Patricio Alvarado Andrade (born 7 February 1960) is a Chilean politician and business manager, militant from Unión Demócrata Independiente (UDI). From June 2020 to July 2020, he served as Minister Secretary General of the Presidency

In 1985, aged 25, Alvarado was appointed by Augusto Pinochet regime (1973–1990) as a major of Quemchi, a northwest commune in Chiloé Island. Then, in 1990s, he was elected deputy for the 58th District which groupes towns from Chiloé. In this position, he remained sixteen years (1994–2010) until 2009–10 general elections won by centre-rightist Sebastián Piñera, who appointed him as General Undersecretary of the Presidency, charge he held during all Piñera's first government (2010–2014).

In 2018, with Piñera's non-consecutive reelection, he was again named as general undersecretary (2018–2019), as Undersecretary of Regional and Administrative Development (2019–2020) and finally as Ministry General Secretariat of the Presidency.

References

External links
 Profile at BCN

1960 births
Living people
20th-century Chilean politicians
21st-century Chilean politicians
Independent Democratic Union politicians
Adolfo Ibáñez University alumni
Mayors of places in Chile
Members of the Chamber of Deputies of Chile
Members of the Senate of Chile
People from Santiago
Senators of the LV Legislative Period of the National Congress of Chile